Rationality: What It Is, Why It Seems Scarce, Why It Matters is a 2021 book written by Canadian-American cognitive scientist Steven Pinker. The book was published on September 28, 2021, by the Viking imprint of Penguin Random House.

It argues that rationality is a key driver of moral and social progress, and it attempts to resolve the apparent conflict between scientific progress and increasing levels of disinformation. Pinker explains several concepts underlying rationality, including from the fields of logic, probability theory, statistics, and social choice.

Reception
The book debuted at number nine on The New York Times nonfiction best-seller list for the week ending October 2, 2021.

In its starred review, Publishers Weekly wrote, "He manages to be scrupulously rigorous yet steadily accessible and entertaining." Kirkus Reviews wrote, "The author can be heady and geeky, but seldom to the point that his discussions shade off into inaccessibility."

References

External links
Rationality: What It Is, Why It Seems Scarce, Why It Matters  on stevenpinker.com

2021 non-fiction books
Works by Steven Pinker
Reasoning
Viking Press books